Ala al-Din Muhammad ( ʿAlāʾ al-Dīn Muhammad) may refer to:

Muhammad II of Khwarazm, ruler of the Khwarezmian Empire from 1200 to 1220
Muhammad III of Alamut, Nizari Isma'ili Imam
Alauddin Muhammad Da'ud Syah II
Alauddin Mahmud Syah II
Alauddin Mahmud Syah II
Alauddin Muhammad Da'ud Syah I